Abdulkarim Ismail Al-Arhabi was the Deputy Prime Minister for Economic Affairs and Minister of Planning and International Cooperation in the Republic of Yemen.  He was also the managing director of the Social Fund for Development, which was established in 1997.  Al-Arhabi held the post of Minister of Social Affairs and Labor from 2001 to 2006, when he was appointed Deputy Prime Minister for Economic Affairs and Minister of Planning and International Cooperation.  On 30 April 2010, the World Bank awarded Al-Arhabi the Jit Gill Memorial Award for Outstanding Public Service for being "a key champion in the battle to reduce poverty, improve governance and broaden economic growth for Yemen."

Following the anti-government 2011 Yemeni protests, President Ali Abdullah Saleh fired all members of the Cabinet of Yemen on 20 March 2011. The cabinet members will remain in place until a new government is formed.

See also
Cabinet of Yemen

References

Year of birth missing (living people)
Living people
Planning and International Cooperation ministers of Yemen
Social Affairs and Labour ministers of Yemen
20th-century Yemeni politicians
First Bajamal Cabinet
Second Bajamal Cabinet
Mujawar Cabinet